Goodman Theatre is a professional theater company located in Chicago's Loop. A major part of the Chicago theatre scene, it is the city's oldest currently active nonprofit theater organization. Part of its present theater complex occupies the landmark Harris and Selwyn Theaters property.

History
The Goodman was founded in 1925 as a tribute to the Chicago playwright Kenneth Sawyer Goodman, who died in the Great Influenza Pandemic in 1918. The theater was funded by Goodman's parents, Mr. and Mrs. William O. Goodman, who donated $250,000 to the Art Institute of Chicago to establish a professional repertory company and a school of drama at the School of the Art Institute of Chicago. The first theater was designed by architect Howard Van Doren Shaw (in the location now occupied by the museum's Modern Wing), although its design was severely hampered by location restrictions resulting in poor acoustics and lack of space for scenery and effects.

The opening ceremony on October 20, 1925, featured three of Kenneth Sawyer Goodman's plays: Back of the Yards, The Green Scarf, and The Game of Chess. Two nights later the theater presented its first public performance, John Galsworthy's The Forest.  The company mainly performed student productions with the addition of professional players through to the 1950s.  In 1969 under artistic director, John Reich, it finally became a fully professional company. In 1978, the drama school became part of DePaul University.

In 2000, the company moved into its new facility at 170 North Dearborn in Chicago's theater district. The  project was designed by KPMB Architects, DLK Architecture Inc., McClier Corporation, associated architects. It has two fully modern auditoriums, named the Albert and the Owen, after two members of the Goodman family who continue to be major donors. In August of that year, Associate Artistic Director Michael Maggio died and the company established the Michael Maggio Emerging Designer Award in his honor which is bestowed alongside the Michael Merritt Award for Excellence in Design and Collaboration.

Awards
In 1992, the theatre company received the Regional Theatre Tony Award, joining Steppenwolf Theatre as Chicago-based recipients of the award.  Since then, three other Chicago-based companies, Victory Gardens Theater (in 2001), Chicago Shakespeare Theater (in 2008), and Lookingglass Theatre Company (in 2011) have also received the award, making Chicago the most recognized city in the country by this prestigious live theater award.  The Goodman has also won many Joseph Jefferson awards.

Productions

With the production of Radio Golf in 2007, the Goodman became the first theater to mount a production of each of the ten plays in August Wilson's Pittsburgh cycle.

The theater has presented A Christmas Carol annually in December since the 1970s.

Other productions the Goodman has staged over the years include Hay Fever, Lady Windermere's Fan, The Little Foxes, You Can't Take it with You, Born Yesterday, Pal Joey, To Be Young, Gifted and Black (play), Guys and Dolls, Talley's Folly, A House Not Meant to Stand, A Soldier's Play, Fences, Sunday in the Park with George, The Visit, Dancing at Lughnasa, Arcadia, Floyd Collins, Hollywood Arms, Dinner with Friends, The Goat, or Who is Sylvia?, The Light in the Piazza, I Am My Own Wife, and Rabbit Hole.

Community Outreach 
In addition to the Goodman's many productions, the theater also hosts many different education programs. Partnering with community organizations, schools, and juvenile detention programs. During the school year, the Goodman hosts the Cyndie Bandle Young Critics (CBYC) and the Goodman Youth Arts Council (GYAC). CBYC creates opportunities for young people to grow their writing skills through critical and analytical works. Participants have the opportunity to critique every show at the Goodman for their neighborhood and school papers. Participants of the GYAC volunteer in workshops for young children, nursing homes, clothing and food drives, and march with striking public-school teachers. Summer programs are focused on youths ages fourteen to twenty-four. Playbuild is a seven week devising workshop where a group of eighty teens throughout Chicago collaborate through several different applied theatre exercises to express themselves with artistic choices. The Goodman hosts a Musical Theatre Intensive (MTI) that runs alongside Playbuild. With a more traditional approach to theatre education, teens audition with a monologue and song, and they will learn to be more confident and mature in their artform.

See also
Goodman School of Drama

References

Further reading
 Appler, Gilbert Keith. "Chicago’s Goodman Theatre: Plays and Cultural Work in an Institutional Theatre." PhD dissertation, University of Illinois-Urbana. 1994
Medgyesy, Laura Louise. "Chicago's Goodman Theatre: the transition from a division of the Art Institute to an independent regional theatre." PhD dissertation, American University. 1981 
 Teague, Anna Dean. "Thomas Wood Stevens' Contributions to American Art Theatre With Emphasis on the Kenneth Sawyer Goodman Memorial Theatre, 1922-1930," PhD dissertation, The Louisiana State University, 1973.

External links
 Official website
 
 Kenneth Sawyer Goodman Papers and Goodman Family Papers at The Newberry Library

Theatre companies in Chicago
Theatres in Chicago
Regional theatre in the United States
Central Chicago
League of Resident Theatres
Tony Award winners
1925 establishments in Illinois
Theatres completed in 1925